The 2022 season was Lightning's third season, in which they competed in the 50 over Rachael Heyhoe Flint Trophy and the Twenty20 Charlotte Edwards Cup. In the Charlotte Edwards Cup, the side finished bottom of Group B, winning one of their six matches. The side finished sixth in the Rachael Heyhoe Flint Trophy, winning two of their six matches.
 
The side was captained by Kathryn Bryce and coached by Chris Guest. They played three home matches at the Haslegrave Ground, two at Grace Road and one apiece at Trent Bridge and the County Ground, Derby.

In September 2022, it was announced that Nottinghamshire CCC would become the new host of the team from the 2023 season, replacing Loughborough University, and that the name and branding of the team would be changing.

Squad

Changes
On 29 October 2021, it was announced that Lightning had signed Marie Kelly from Central Sparks, and that she had signed a professional contract with the side. On the same day, Abigail Freeborn left the side, joining Central Sparks. On 29 April 2022, it was announced that Yvonne Graves had left the side, joining Northern Diamonds. On 11 May 2022, Lightning announced their 18-player squad for the season, confirming the signing of Katie Midwood from Sunrisers, Piepa Cleary as an overseas player, and Ilenia Sims from the Academy. Shachi Pai departed the side for North West Thunder, Nancy Harman moved to Southern Vipers, and Sonia Odedra and Leah Kellogg were no longer included in the squad compared to the previous season. In July 2022, Emily Windsor joined the side on loan from Southern Vipers for the first match of the Rachael Heyhoe Flint Trophy. Later in July, Gwenan Davies was signed on loan from Central Sparks for two matches the Rachael Heyhoe Flint Trophy. Academy player Rhiannon Knowling-Davies was first named in a matchday squad on 16 July 2022. In September, Georgie Boyce joined the side from North West Thunder.

On 20 October 2021, it was announced that Head Coach Rob Taylor was leaving the club. Chris Guest was announced his replacement on 1 December 2021.

Squad list
 Age given is at the start of Lightning's first match of the season (14 May 2022).

Charlotte Edwards Cup

Group B

 advanced to the final

Fixtures

Tournament statistics

Batting

Source: ESPN Cricinfo Qualification: 50 runs.

Bowling

Source: ESPN Cricinfo Qualification: 5 wickets.

Rachael Heyhoe Flint Trophy

Season standings

 advanced to final
 advanced to the play-off

Fixtures

Tournament statistics

Batting

Source: ESPN Cricinfo Qualification: 100 runs.

Bowling

Source: ESPN Cricinfo Qualification: 5 wickets.

Season statistics

Batting

Bowling

Fielding

Wicket-keeping

References

The Blaze (women's cricket) seasons
2022 in English women's cricket